
Gmina Pniewy is an urban-rural gmina (administrative district) in Szamotuły County, Greater Poland Voivodeship, in west-central Poland.

Villages
Apart from the town of Pniewy, Gmina Pniewy contains the villages and settlements of Berdychowo, Buszewko, Buszewo, Chełmno, Dąbrowa, Dębina, Dęborzyce, Jakubowo, Karmin, Kikowo, Konin, Konin-Huby, Koninek, Koszanowo, Lubocześnica, Lubosina, Nojewo, Nosalewo, Orliczko, Podborowo, Podpniewki, Przystanki, Psarce, Psarskie, Rudka, Szymanowo, Turowo, Zajączkowo and Zamorze.

Neighbouring gminas
Gmina Pniewy is bordered by the gminas of Chrzypsko Wielkie, Duszniki, Kwilcz, Lwówek, Ostroróg, Szamotuły and Wronki.

References
Polish official population figures 2006

Pniewy
Gmina Pniewy